Bjarni Benediktsson (30 April 1908 – 10 July 1970) was an Icelandic politician of the Independence Party who served as prime minister of Iceland from 1963 to 1970. His father,  (1877–1954), was a leader in the independence movement in Iceland and a member of the Althingi from 1908 to 1931.

Bjarni studied constitutional law and became a professor at the University of Iceland at age 24. He was elected to the city council in Reykjavík in 1934 as a member of the Independence Party and from 1940 to 1947 was mayor of the city.

In 1947 he became Foreign Minister and served in various posts in cabinets until 1956. Bjarni was mainly responsible for Iceland joining NATO in 1949, against significant opposition, and for giving the United States Air Force a lease on Keflavík Airport near Reykjavík, which was of major strategic importance during the Cold War.

Bjarni was caricatured by the Nobel prize winning writer Halldór Laxness in his 1948 play  (The Atom Station).

In 1956, when the left-wing parties formed a coalition government, Bjarni, out of office, became editor of Morgunblaðið, a leading conservative newspaper.

In 1959, when the Independence Party formed a coalition government with the Social Democrats, Bjarni became Minister of Justice. He served as speaker of the Althing in 1959. Two years later he was elected chairman of the Independence Party and in 1963 he took over from Ólafur Thors as Prime Minister. He served in this position until his death, which was caused by a fire at a government summer house at Þingvellir; his wife and grandson also perished in the blaze.

Bjarni was the father of Björn Bjarnason and Valgerður Bjarnadóttir, as well as the father-in-law of Vilmundur Gylfason. Bjarni was the great-uncle of his namesake Bjarni Benediktsson, who became Prime Minister in January 2017.

References

Further reading
  Text of a speech in the Icelandic parliament by Sigurvin Einarsson on 10 October 1970, commemorating Bjarni

|-

|-

1908 births
1970 deaths
Bjarni Benediktsson
Bjarni Benediktsson
Bjarni Benediktsson
Bjarni Benediktsson
Bjarni Benediktsson
Speakers of the Althing
Bjarni Benediktsson
Grand Crosses 1st class of the Order of Merit of the Federal Republic of Germany